Filip Timov (born 22 May 1992) is a German-born Macedonian footballer who plays for German lower league side FV Bonn-Endenich as a winger.

Club career
In the 2012-13 season he played for Armenian Club Impulse where he finished the season as one of the top 10 Scorers of the Armenian Premier League that year.

In 2013, he joined Aris Limassol in Cyprus.

International career
In 2012, he debuted for the Macedonian U21 National Team, and since then he has made 11 appearances and scored 1 goal in an away game against Northern Ireland U21 during the Euro U21 2013 Qualifications.

References

External links

 German career stats - FuPa

1992 births
Living people
Sportspeople from Bonn
Association football wingers
Macedonian footballers
North Macedonia youth international footballers
North Macedonia under-21 international footballers
FK Belasica players
FC Koper players
NK Ankaran players
FC Impuls Dilijan players
Aris Limassol FC players
CS Concordia Chiajna players
FC Urartu players
FK Horizont Turnovo players
FK Sileks players
Slovenian PrvaLiga players
Armenian Premier League players
Cypriot First Division players
Liga I players
Macedonian First Football League players
Macedonian expatriate footballers
Expatriate footballers in Slovenia
Macedonian expatriate sportspeople in Slovenia
Expatriate footballers in Armenia
Macedonian expatriate sportspeople in Armenia
Expatriate footballers in Cyprus
Macedonian expatriate sportspeople in Cyprus
Expatriate footballers in Romania
Macedonian expatriate sportspeople in Romania